The following is a list of episodes from the sketch comedy group the Whitest Kids U' Know which ran from March 20, 2007 – June 17, 2011 with a total of 60 episodes and 5 seasons on Fuse and IFC.

Based on counting the number of skits in this article, the series contained 381 sketches.

Season 1 (2007)

Season 2 (2008)

Season 3 (2009)

Season 4 (2010)

Season 5 (2011)

Whitest Kids U' Know